Atomopteryx serpentifera is a moth in the family Crambidae. It was described by George Hampson in 1913. It is found in the Bahamas, Puerto Rico and Cuba.

References

Moths described in 1913
Spilomelinae
Moths of the Caribbean